Metronome is a light-weight XMPP server written in Lua based on Prosody. It's aimed to provide advanced features while maintaining a modest resource usage. Extensive PubSub and Microblogging over XMPP support along other extensions including: Stream Management, CSI, full support of Bidirectional S2S Streams (BIDI), MAM, Push Notifications, Security Labels, Direct TLS support for C2S/S2S.

History 
Coding of Metronome started in August 2012 due to the increasing needs to customize the Prosody codebase to suit the LW.Org IM xmpp service requirements. Initially the codebase was not meant to be released, but after the adoption by the Jappix main service, the code was opensourced and released under a dual ISC/MIT License.

Deployments and Mentions 
It is the default XMPP daemon for the YunoHost Debian based distribution.

It was the server of the Jappix (Official Service) a web-based IM Social Platform/XMPP Client.

And also was the server below Movim (Official Pod) a distributed web-based social platform.

See also 

 Comparison of XMPP server software

References

External links 
 XSF Server Software list
 "Awesome-XMPP" A curated list of delightful XMPP related resources
 Supported server-side XEP list
 Metronome IM Project on Ohloh
 Metronome IM Project on GitHub

Instant messaging server software
Free software programmed in Lua (programming language)
Software using the ISC license